Thanayong Wongtrakul, nickname Kradum, was born on November 27, 1970 in Thailand. He is an actor, known for Children of the Dark (2008) and The Man from Nowhere (2010).

Filmography

Film

Television dramas

Television series
 2012 Zeal 5 Kon Gla Tah Atam (/Ch.5) as (Ep.93) Guest role
 2012 The Sixth Sense (/Ch.3) as Piyaphan (Resort Owner)
 2016 I Was Born In the Reign of Rama IX The Series (เราเกิดในรัชกาลที่ ๙ เดอะซีรีส์) (The One Enterprise/One 31) as Police (ตำรวจ) (Cameo)
 2018  (ซีรีส์ ฤดูกาลแห่งรัก: ฝน) (/Thai PBS) as police Inspector (สารวัตรตํารวจ) 
 2021 Golden Blood (รักมันมหาศาล) (/Ch.3) as Sakkhee (Gangster)
 2021 YOU...VACCINE (/Thai PBS) as Doctor Trin
 2022 Something in My Room (ผมกับผีในห้อง) (/Ch.3) as Phra Krai
 2022 Jao Ying Lhong Yook (2022) (เจ้าหญิงหลงยุค) (Pai Kor Rai/Ch.9) as Jao Ai Kam Tan
 2022  (ทริอาช The Series) (TV Thunder/Ch.3) as Doctor Sak
 2022  (พาย สายน้ำแห่งความฝัน) (D O do multimedia/Thai PBS) as Natee with Orn-anong Panyawong
 2022 Catch Me Baby (เซียนสับราง) (Bearcave Studio/WeTV) as Chanwat Paophandee (Sia-wat) (Captain's father) with Cindy Bishop (Cameo)
 2023 Chain Of Heart (ตรวนธรณี) (MAXIMON SOLUTION/Ch.3) as Ait (Hin, Din, Sai's father) with Prissana Klampinij

Awards and nominations

References

External links

Living people
1970 births
Thanayong Wongtrakul
Thanayong Wongtrakul
Thanayong Wongtrakul
Thanayong Wongtrakul
Thanayong Wongtrakul